Christopher Iga is a Ugandan politician. He was mayor of Kampala from 1989 to 1997 when he was replaced by Nasser Ntege Ssebagala.

References

Living people
Mayors of Kampala
People from Kampala
Year of birth missing (living people)